Dorothy Page (March 4, 1904 – March 26, 1961), also known as The Singing Cowgirl, was a B-movie film actress during the 1930s.

Early life
Dorothy Page was born Dorothy Lillian Stofflett on March 4, 1904 in Northampton, Pennsylvania, United States.

Education
In the 1920s, Page attended Cedar Crest College, where she majored in music.

Career

Modeling
Page was chosen by the Curtis Publishing Company in the 1920s as a model for a Saturday Evening Post cover. Her portrait, painted by artist Neysa McMein, dubbed her "One of America's Ten Most Beautiful Women".

Singing career
Page tried out for the "Youth of America" in a singing contest hosted by Paul Whiteman, and won. With that, her radio and singing career began, and her stage name was created. By 1935, she was a regular on the Paducah Plantation, written and hosted by Irvin S. Cobb.

Acting career
That same year, Universal Pictures signed her to a contract. Her first film was Manhattan Blue, starring opposite Ricardo Cortez, which saw moderate success and placed a spotlight on her talent as a singer and an actress. She then starred in King Solomon of Broadway opposite Edmund Lowe and Pinky Tomlin. That film was only moderately successful, and it wasn't until 1938 that she starred in another film, this time alongside Mary Boland and Ernest Truex in Mama Runs Wild. That movie also was not successful, and Page was not given any singing parts in the film.

In late 1938, Grand National Pictures announced its intention to do a series of cowboy based films utilizing a "Singing Cowgirl". The first of these was Water Rustlers in 1939, starring Page and Dave O'Brien. Unfortunately the movie-going public did not accept a woman in the lead role of a western.

Ride 'Em Cowgirl was released next, that same year, and fared even worse than the first. Later that same year, The Singing Cowgirl was released, in which Page again starred with O'Brien. It would be the last film by Grand National Pictures, and shortly thereafter they went out of business.

In 1947, Page appeared on Broadway in the drama Dear Judas.

Retirement
Following the failure of the three "singing cowgirl" films, and the end of Grand National Pictures, Page retired from acting. Page began working in realty, buying old Hollywood houses, remodeling them and selling them at a profit. This second career proved very successful financially.

She and husband Henry Clark McCormick lived at his ranch in Fresno. Page purchased a  cotton ranch near Pecos, Texas. During the 1950s, she was diagnosed with cancer and began a long and painful battle against it. Page moved to LaBelle, Florida to be closer to Fort Myers, where she was receiving cancer treatment.

Personal life 
On July 3, 1925, at age 21, Page married Waldo Shipton of Detroit, a doctor she met in college at Cedar Crest College. The couple had two daughters by 1929. They divorced in 1932. Later, she married Los Angeles attorney Frederick D. Leuschner, and they resided at his ranch in Tarzana, California. He died on December 6, 1941 at age 36 from heart failure. She then married Henry Clark McCormick of Fresno, California. They divorced after she was diagnosed with cancer.

Death 
Page died in LaBelle, Florida from cancer on March 26, 1961 at age 57.

Homage 
In one of Columbo's episodes ("Ashes to Ashes", Season 10 Episode 12), she may have been portrayed in the character of Dorothea Page, the deceased silent film star from whom Patrick McGoohan (in his role as Eric Prince, funeral director to the stars) stole a valuable diamond off her deceased body. Portraying her in this episode as a silent movie star may have been to show the way society in the late 1930s wanted to silence the "Singing Cowgirl".

References

External links

Dorothy Page at b-westerns.com

Actresses from Pennsylvania
Deaths from cancer in Florida
American film actresses
1904 births
1961 deaths
20th-century American actresses
People from Hendry County, Florida
People from Fresno, California
Cedar Crest College alumni
People from Northampton, Pennsylvania